The MJCast  is an audio podcast that discusses topics and news as it relates to American singer and entertainer, Michael Jackson, and the Jackson family. The podcast was founded in 2015 with the goal of keeping Jackson’s legacy alive by interviewing guests who were closest to the singer. The MJCast continues to release new episodes on Apple Podcasts, Spotify, and YouTube.

Format
The podcast was founded by Jamon Bull and Q Gabriel-Smith. Bull and Elise Capron are the show hosts. Charlie Carter is the show's audio producer. There are three distinct formats: The first format is regular news and discussion episodes. Secondly, there are roundtable discussions on specific topics like albums and videos. The third format is special interviews with guests who knew and worked with Michael Jackson personally and professionally. Some of their past guests include Michael Jackson's nephews from R&B singing group, 3T, brother Tito Jackson, Jacksons's personal photographer, Steven Paul Whitsitt, American sculptor, Diana Walczak, Jackson's 2005 trial lawyer, Thomas Mesereau, choreographer Vincent Paterson, Savage Garden's frontman Darren Hayes, pianist and keyboardist John Barnes and many other Jackson family members, Jackson friends, celebrities, and musicians that worked with the star.

Acknowledgements
In 2017, The MJCast was acknowledged by Mashable and Rolling Stone when they called for boycotts of the British comedy special Urban Myths for their portrayal of Jackson, which prompted the entertainer's daughter, Paris Jackson, to vehemently object to Joseph Fiennes portraying her late father. In 2021, The MJCast was interviewed by Podcast Magazine. The publication focused on the hosts and their reasoning behind doing the podcast, the history of the show, and the show's success.

Episodes

References

External links
 

Works about Michael Jackson
Audio podcasts
2015 podcast debuts
Interview podcasts
Music podcasts
News podcasts
Arts podcasts